Thinzar Wint Kyaw (also spelled Thin Zar Wint Kyaw, ; born 4 December  1986) is a Burmese actress and model. Thinzar was listed on The Myanmar Times "Top 10 Actor" list in 2019. Throughout her successful career, she has acted in over 500 Burmese films.

Early life and education
Thinzar Wint Kyaw was born on 4 December 1987 in Yangon, Myanmar. She is the second daughter in her family. She attended the East Yangon University.

Career
She began her career as a commercial model. After she switched her career to film from modelling, she rose to fame in the eyes of many filmography companies thereafter with a lot of acting assigns. Since 2017, she had to play in several films such as Min lal Bo-K Ngar lal Bo-K and A Ywal 3 Par Chit Tat The, ThuNgalChinYoukKhama 2, Thu Ngal and Wit Nhyn Ka Kyoe.

Her notable internationally recognized film was Shwe Kyar directed by Wyne which educational drama film that screened in Myanmar, Singapore and Malaysia cinemas in 2018, both in English and Burmese languages, with that her movie had won several Myanmar Academy Awards in 2019.

Political activities
Following the 2021 Myanmar coup d'état, she participated in the anti-coup movement both in person at rallies and through social media channels with 2.8 million followers. She joined the "We Want Justice" three-finger salute movement. The movement, launched on social media, has been joined by many celebrities.

Arrest
On 6 July 2022, Thinzar arrested after her visit to the headquarter of Shan State Progress Party (SSPP), where she was said to have attended with wearing an SSA military uniform at the wedding ceremony of the daughter of Colonel San Suh of Shan State Progressive Party/Shan State Army. The junta army is clashing now with SSPP/SSA in Momeik area in northern Shan state and her visit to SSPP headquarter has sparked an outcry for the pro-military group.

A statement from SSPP Info said that the Shan State Progressive Party/Shan State Army (SSPP/SSA) had offered to film local development projects such as religion, education, health and transportation. The pro-military lobby groups led by Han Nyein Oo who is believed to be a military spy call on the junta army to permanently stop her from modelling and entertainment. The pro-military lobby groups led by Han Nyein Oo who is believed to be a military spy call on the junta army to permanently stop her from modelling and entertainment.

On 5 August 2022, The military junta has opened a legal case against Thinzar Wint Kyaw and model Nang Mwe San as the due are accused of harming Myanmar culture and distributing sexually explosive photos and videos on social networks. According to a announcement by state controlled media MRTV, they have been arrested under Section 33(a) of Electronic Law for earning money by posting sexually revealing photos on the websites OnlyFans and Extrania.

Selected filmography

Film (Cinema)

Moe Nya Einmet Myu (2009)
A Lann Zayar (2011)
A Lann Lun A Lun Lann (2012)
A Mike Sar (2013)
Chit San Eain 2028 (2015)
Min lal Bo-K Ngar lal Bo-K (2016)
Khoe Soe Lu Hnite (2016)
Wit Nyin Ka Kyoe (2017)
Shwe Kyar (2018)
Toe Kyaw Man Nae Nan San Tae Ywar (2018)
Ma Tahtaung Ta Kg Bwar (2018)
Tel Gyet (Decoy)() (2018)
MIDNIGHT (2019)
A Chit Sone Crush? (2019)
Mya Mya ( (2020)
Than Yaw Zin Min Thar 
Ma Chit That Tu Chin

References

External links

1987 births
Living people
Burmese film actresses
Burmese female models
21st-century Burmese actresses
21st-century Burmese women singers
People from Yangon